Mousa Khani Mansion is located in Iran, in the city of Shahr-e Babak of Kerman province. It is one of the historical monuments dating to the Qajar era.

The building was constructed between 1886 and 1871. It covers an area of 7,500 square meters (2,300 square meters under the building, 5200 square meters of mansion garden). There are many endowments in the mansion.

The building was constructed by the order of Mousa Khan the son of the ruler of Shahr-e Babak at that time. This was at the same time when Iran was ruled by Mohammad Shah Qajar and Naser al-Din Shah Qajar.

The Mousa Khani building has been decorated inside and outside with gypsum in various parts. Materials used in the construction are raw clay and clay, straw, lime, gypsum, stone, wood and glass. The type of wood used in the doors and windows are of walnut wood while columns and pillars are made out of berry tree.

The Building 
The building is built on two floors and on three main sides:

Northern side, (winter) made duplex. It has a twin winder used in the Spring. The winders were later changed into security guard towers. This section is currently used as the Museum of Anthropology.

Western side, (summer) The use of this side has been in the summer. On this side is a large and long winder that its crown was damaged in the flood of 1986.

South side, (Spring) All rooms and its main porch overlook the large garden and its smaller garden inside. The south side contains two symmetrical two floor porches and a veranda in the middle.

Gallery

References

Buildings and structures in Kerman Province
Tourist attractions in Kerman Province
National works of Iran